A bacchius is a metrical foot used in poetry.

In accentual-syllabic verse we could describe a bacchius as a foot that goes like this:

Example:

When day breaks

the fish bite

at small flies.

The Christmas carol 'No Small Wonder' by Paul Edwards is a fair example of usage.

Metrical feet